Gormenghast may refer to:

 Gormenghast (series), a trilogy of novels by Mervyn Peake
 Gormenghast (novel), second in the series
 Gormenghast (opera), an opera based on the books
 Gormenghast (TV serial), a BBC adaptation